The White Motor Company was an American automobile, truck, bus and agricultural tractor manufacturer from 1900 until 1980. The company also produced bicycles, roller skates, automatic lathes, and sewing machines. Before World War II, the company was based in Cleveland, Ohio. White Diesel Engine Division in Springfield, Ohio, manufactured diesel engine generators, which powered U.S. military equipment and infrastructure, namely Army Nike and Air Force Bomarc launch complexes, and other guided missile installations and proving grounds, sections of SAGE and DEW Line stations, radars, Combat Direction Centers and other ground facilities of the U.S. aerospace defense ring, such as the Texas Towers.

During the Vietnam Era, the company retained its position within the Top 100 Defense Contractors list (it ranked 87th in the Fiscal Year 1965, 77th in 1967, 73rd in 1968, 89th in 1969). Its production facilities, such as the Lansing truck plant in Lansing, Michigan, and the main plant in Cleveland were engaged in production, inspection, engineering services and maintenance of thousands of military/utility cargo trucks M39, M44, M600, and M602 series trucks, as well as spare parts, such as cylinder heads, diesel and gasoline engines with accessories.

History

Around 1898, Thomas H. White purchased a Locomobile steam car and found its boiler unreliable. His son, Rollin, set out to improve its design. Rollin White developed a form of water tube steam generator which consisted of a series of stacked coils with two novel features: the first was that the coils were all joined at the top of the unit, which allowed water to flow only when pumped, allowing control of the steam generation; the second was pulling steam from the lowest coil, closest to the fire, which allowed control of steam temperature. This second point was critical because the White steamer operated with superheated steam to take advantage of steam's properties at higher temperatures. Rollin White patented his steam generator, US patent 659,837 of 1900.

White steamer

Rollin H. White patented his new design and offered it to, among others, Locomobile. Finally, he persuaded his father, founder of the White Sewing Machine Company, to allow the use of a corner in one of his buildings to build an automobile.

White's brother, Windsor, who was a management talent, joined the business venture, followed by their brother, Walter, who became instrumental in the sales, promotion and distribution of the product. The first group of fifty cars were completed in October 1900, but none were offered to the public until April 1901 so the design could be thoroughly tested. Since the cars were being offered by the automobile department of the sewing machine company, White could not afford to diminish the reputation of the parent company by the introduction of an untested product.

In 1905, it became necessary to separate the automobile department from its parent company to accommodate the growth of the business and to physically separate them, as a fire in one could ruin both operations.

A 1907 White steamer was one of the early vehicles in the White House when Theodore Roosevelt, the 26th President of the United States, allowed the Secret Service to use the car behind his horse-drawn carriage. In 1909, president William Howard Taft converted the White House stables into a garage and purchased four automobiles: two Pierce-Arrows, a Baker Electric, and a 1911 White. This $4,000 car was one of the last steam cars produced and proved a favorite of the President who used bursts of steam against "pesky" press photographers. The  White Model M 7-seat tourer generated favorable press for the newly formed White Motor Company.  Taft's White Model M is currently housed in the collection at the Heritage Museums and Gardens in Sandwich, Massachusetts.

The last steam car was built in January 1911 as the company made a transition to gasoline-powered vehicles. The company continued to show them in their catalogues as late as 1912. About 10,000 White steam-powered cars were built, more than the better known Stanley.
In 2019 Mitch Gross and Chris Rolph drove a 1910 model MM 40 hp White steam car from Beijing to Paris, likely the only time such a feat has been done by a steam car. The journey of over 8000 miles crossed 12 countries, 7 time zones and included the first crossing of a major desert (the Gobi) by a steam car.

The White steam car reentered popular culture when comedian and classic car collector Jay Leno, while repairing his 1907 White steam car in his garage in Burbank, suffered third-degree burns on his face and hands when a fuel line sprayed him at the same time a spark ignited.

Gasoline models
White companies' manufacturing facility expanded. The White steamer used unique technology, and it was vulnerable in a market that was accepting the internal combustion engine as the standard. White canvassed existing gas manufacturers and licensed the rights to the Delahaye design for the "gas car", showing a chassis at an English auto show in December 1908.

White tractors
Rollin became more interested in agricultural tractors, and developed designs for tractors derived from standard White truck parts. When the White Company was not interested in producing tractors, Rollin set out to develop his own designs and, with brother Clarence, eventually founded Cleveland Motor Plow, which later became Cletrac tractor. In the early 1920s, Rollin briefly produced the Rollin car to diversify the tractor company, but found it could not compete in cost versus price against much larger manufacturers.

White was successful with their heavy machines, which saw service around the world during World War I. White remained in the truck industry for decades.

Truck manufacturing

White Motor Company ended car production after World War I to focus exclusively on trucks. The company soon sold 10 percent of all trucks made in the US. Although White produced all sizes of trucks from light delivery to semi, the decision was made after WWII to produce only large trucks. White acquired several truck manufacturing companies during this time: Sterling (in 1951), Autocar (in 1953),
REO (in 1957) and Diamond T (in 1958). White also agreed to sell Consolidated Freightways, Freightliner Trucks through its own dealers. White produced trucks under the Autocar nameplate following its acquisition. Diamond T and REO Motor Car Company became the Diamond REO division, which was discontinued in the 1970s.

A White semi performed a role in the 1949 James Cagney film White Heat. This era was probably the peak of White Motor market penetration, with the substantial gasoline engined tractors moving a large part of the tractor trailer fleet.

White designed and (with other companies) produced the M3 Scout Car, the standard United States Army reconnaissance vehicle at the start of World War II. White also built the later M2, M3, M13 and M16 half-tracks.

In 1967, White started the Western Star division to sell trucks on the west coast.

White buses

The White Model 706 chassis emerged as the winner of a four-way competition with Ford, REO and GMC, held by the National Park Service in 1935 at Yosemite National Park. Starting in 1936, White produced 500 of the Model 706, specifically designed to carry passengers through seven of the major National Parks of the western US; bus tours were offered as most tourists arrived from trains before World War II. The distinctive vehicles, with roll-back canvas convertible tops, were the product of noted industrial designer Alexis de Sakhnoffsky and used bodies from the Bender Body Company of Cleveland. They originally operated in seven National Parks: Glacier, Grand Canyon, Mount Rainier, Rocky Mountain, Yellowstone, Yosemite, and Zion. After being retired from service in the 1960s, many buses were sold to private collectors and tour operators. The Skagway Street Car Company assembled a fleet of eight buses starting in 1987, naming each bus for the location from which they were acquired.

Today, Glacier National Park operates 33 of its original 35 buses, where they are referred to as "Red Jammers", and eight (of an original 98) have been restored for renewed service in Yellowstone National Park. Glacier's 33 buses were refurbished by Ford and TransGlobal in 2000–2002, while Yellowstone's eight buses were refurbished by TransGlobal in 2007. Glacier has kept one bus in original condition. Yellowstone has five White buses in original condition, two model 706s and three older units as well. In addition, a private operator uses two of the White 706 buses originally built for Yellowstone for Gettysburg National Battlefield tours. One ex-Mount Rainier White 706 is on display at the Longmire Historic District.

The bus driven by Egg Shen in the film Big Trouble in Little China into Chinatown, San Francisco is a White 706 which was later purchased by the Skagway Street Car Company. It was one of the eight sold to Xanterra in 2001; they were subsequently restored by TransGlobal for tours in Yellowstone. The character "Ol Jammer" from the Disney animated film Planes: Fire and Rescue is based on the White 706.

In addition to the National Parks touring buses, White built similar buses with fixed roofs for intercity service. White entered the transit bus market in 1937 with the 700 series, available in  lengths. The longer model was produced through 1953, with an update in 1948 as the 1100 series.

Company culture

During the time brothers Walter and Windsor White ran the company, it offered a library branch, a store which sold necessities at low cost, sports teams, and concerts by orchestras and jazz bands, as well as musical performances by the workers, many of whom were immigrants from Slovenia and Poland. The company also had picnics at Euclid Beach Park.

After Walter White was fatally injured in a traffic accident, management changed and so did the firm's culture. Employees started one of the country's first automobile unions. The Great Depression caused a drop in sales, forcing White to merge with Studebaker. However, White soon became independent again.

In 1935, Robert Fager Black became president, but workers were still unhappy, and they went on strike. Black tried talking to the workers who were striking, and he even got baseball equipment for them and let them play while on strike, so they would have something to do. Black learned people's names, visited the plant frequently, and asked customers if they were happy with what they purchased. Anyone could visit his office.

Black brought the company back to where it had once been by World War II, during which the company supplied the military with much of its equipment. White ranked 54th among US corporations in the value of World War II military production contracts. When husbands went to serve, wives took their jobs, and the work force totaled over 4000. Black provided the services the company had at one time, and helped employees get to work with carpools.

Black retired in 1956, still beloved by employees.

Demise

In 1953, White purchased Pittsburgh, Pennsylvania-based Autocar Company. From 1951 until 1977, White Motors also distributed Freightliner Trucks. This took place under an agreement with Freightliner's parent, Consolidated Freightways. White manufactured trucks under its own brands—White, Autocar, and Western Star—as well, leading to the company becoming known as the "Big Four" through to the mid-1970s. The Sterling nameplate, unused by White as long as the company owned it, went to Freightliner after the companies' split. It was then used by Daimler Trucks, who manufactured the former Ford heavy truck line under the Sterling name, from 1997 to 2008.

Sales dropped during the 1960s, and White tried merging with White Consolidated Industries, the company that once made sewing machines; the federal government blocked this deal. The company opened plants in Virginia and Utah, since they did not have unions, but this did not help. Semon Knudsen, former president of Ford, made the company successful for a time, but the decline continued. Later, the federal government approved a merger with White Consolidated, which feared being hurt by White Motor's troubles. Mergers with Daimler and Renault were also considered. Production was somewhat limited as White did not have a lighter range (13,330 units built in 1978), leading to several attempts at linking up with various European manufacturers.

By 1980, White was insolvent, filing Chapter 11 bankruptcy case  in the Northern District of Ohio on September 4 of that year. Volvo acquired the US assets of the company in 1981, while two energy-related companies based in Calgary, Alberta, Bow Valley Resource Services, and NovaCorp, an Alberta corporation, purchased the Canadian assets, including the Kelowna, British Columbia, plant, and the Western Star nameplate and product range.

Volvo produced trucks as White and Autocar through the 1980s, while Western Star continued independently in Canada and the United States, although Volvo-White–produced high cab over engine models were purchased and rebadged Western Star for sale in the Canadian market through the early 1990s.

In 1988, Volvo and General Motors merged their heavy truck divisions in North America, creating Volvo GM Heavy Truck Corporation and a new brand of trucks, White-GMC. Western Star was sold to Australian entrepreneur Terry Peabody in 1990. In 1997, Volvo purchased the stake of General Motors in their joint venture and rebadged White-GMC vehicles under the Volvo and Autocar nameplates. Subsequently, Western Star was resold by Peabody to DaimlerChrysler and merged with its Freightliner subsidiary. Volvo dropped any reference to White, and is now Volvo Trucks North America. Autocar remained a part of Volvo until 2000, when the brand was withdrawn from the market, and was subsequently sold to Grand Vehicle Works together with the Xpeditor low cab forward heavy duty product, which remains in production under the Autocar badge, the last vestige of what was once America's leading commercial vehicle producer.

A former White subsidiary, White Farm Equipment, produced farm tractors until 2001. As of 2006, the only products made under the White name are a series of corn planters (made by AGCO) and garden tractors (made by MTD Products).

Products

 WIA64T
 WC
 WX42 pumper/rescue
 White Horse (1939–1950s)
 50A bus
 444 T
 600
 666
 700
 701
 704
 706 National Park bus
 706
 707
 784
 798
 800
 805
 810
 820
 920
 1064
 1100
 1144
 1500
 2064
 3000
 3015
 3020
 3022
 3400
 4000
 4200
 4264
 4400
 4464
 5000
 5400
 6000
 7000
 9000
 9062
 9064
 Construcktor
 M3 Scout Car
 M2
 M3
 M13
 M16
 PDQ Delivery (1960–1966)
 Road Boss 1 and 2
 Road Commander 1 and 2
 Road Xpeditor 1 and 2 (WX)
 Western Star Trucks
 Freightliner Trucks
 Autocar Company
 Orion Bus

See also
 Oliver Heritage Magazine
 White armored car
 White Farm Equipment
 White Sewing Machine Company
 White-Westinghouse

References

 "American Truck & Bus Spotter's Guide: 1920-1985," by Tad Burness
 "White Trucks of the 1950s At Work" by Barry R. Bertram
 "White Trucks of the 1960s At Work" by Barry R. Bertram

External links

 On the move
 Car history - Ritzsite.nl
 White Truck Pictures - Barraclou.com
 White Truck Pictures - Hank's Truck Pictures
 1945 advertisement for White Buses
 Cletrac and Oliver Tractors
 
 

 
Defunct bus manufacturers of the United States
Defunct motor vehicle manufacturers of the United States
Defunct truck manufacturers of the United States
Historic American Engineering Record in Ohio
Manufacturing companies based in Cleveland
Manufacturing companies disestablished in 1980
Motor vehicle manufacturers based in Ohio
Vehicle manufacturing companies established in 1900
1900 establishments in Ohio
1980 disestablishments in Ohio
White Consolidated Industries
Companies that filed for Chapter 11 bankruptcy in 1980
Defunct manufacturing companies based in Ohio